Thug Life is a 2001 film written, produced, and directed by Greg Carter.

A young man trying to grow up straight in a crime-ridden neighborhood finds himself on the run after a friend accidentally lures him into a trap in this hard-edged urban drama. Boo (Thomas Miles) grew up in a rough section of Houston, TX, where many see crime as their only way out. Boo is determined to leave the street life behind and build an honest career for himself as a plumber, but his longtime friend Mecca (Gregory O. Stewart) talks Boo into helping him out as he tries to sell a stolen vehicle. Things don't go as planned, and when shots ring out, Boo and Mecca discover they've been framed for the murder of a gang leader and have to get out of Houston at once if they are to stand any chance of surviving the night. Thug Life also features noted hip-hop and reggae artists Vybz Kartel, Willie D., The Lady of Rage, and Napoleon.

Film cast
Thomas Miles .... Boo
Gregory O. Stewart .... Mecca
Napoleon .... Vee
Franklyn J. Anderson .... Old Man / Snitch
Willie D.... Isaac
Roy Fegan.... Damon
Johnathan Gwyn .... Chacho
Junie Hoang .... Nurse
Lady of Rage .... Ami
Jalene Mack .... Mecca's Aunt a.k.a. Ms. Johnson
Bruce Lee Wynn .... Willard

External links 
 
 

2001 films
Hood films
2000s crime drama films
American crime drama films
2001 drama films
2000s English-language films
2000s American films